Nigel Hamilton may refer to:

 Nigel Hamilton (civil servant), former head of the Northern Ireland Civil Service
 Nigel Hamilton (author) (born 1944), biographer